The Sony E 18-55mm F3.5-5.6 OSS is a variable maximum aperture standard zoom lens for the Sony E-mount, announced by Sony on May 11, 2010. The lens is often bundled with various Sony α mirrorless cameras as a "kit lens".

Construction
The lens barrel is made of magnesium alloy, and the zoom ring will scratch after some weeks of regular use.

Optical properties
The lens has significant distortion at 18mm and 35mm, but less so at other focal lengths. Similarly, lateral chromatic aberration is particularly noticeable at these focal lengths, and increases as the lens is stopped down. While center sharpness is high at all focal lengths, there is strong fall-off towards the edges and corners, particularly at 18mm. Neither edge nor center performance improve much at other focal lengths. Coma is well-corrected, but "when it comes to flares, the Sony E 18–55 f/3.5–5.6 OSS fails spectacularly", according to reviewer Symon Starczewski of LensTip.com. Optical stabilisation gives a benefit of two stops.

See also
List of Sony E-mount lenses
Sony E PZ 16-50mm F3.5-5.6 OSS
Sony E 18-50mm F4-5.6

References

Camera lenses introduced in 2010
18-55